Dziewulski is a lunar impact crater on the far side of the Moon. It lies between the craters Edison to the north and Popov to the south. The outer rim of this crater has been considerably worn by impacts, particularly along the southwest quadrant where the satellite crater Dziewulski Q overlies the rim and the interior floor. The northern rim is also heavily disrupted, and several small crater lie along the southeast rim. The interior floor and surrounding terrain has been resurfaced.

Beginning at the southern edge, a chain of craters forms a linear formation running to the southeast past Popov. This feature is named Catena Dziewulski.

Satellite craters
By convention these features are identified on lunar maps by placing the letter on the side of the crater midpoint that is closest to Dziewulski.

References

 
 
 
 
 
 
 
 
 
 
 
 

Impact craters on the Moon